Blending inheritance is an obsolete theory in biology from the 19th century. The theory is that the progeny inherits any characteristic as the average of the parents' values of that characteristic. As an example of this, a crossing of a red flower variety with a white variety of the same species would yield pink-flowered offspring.

Charles Darwin's theory of inheritance by pangenesis, with contributions to egg or sperm from every part of the body, implied blending inheritance. His reliance on this mechanism led Fleeming Jenkin to attack Darwin's theory of natural selection on the grounds that blending inheritance would average out any novel beneficial characteristic before selection had time to act.

Blending inheritance was discarded with the general acceptance of particulate inheritance during the development of modern genetics, after circa 1900.

History

Darwin's pangenesis

Charles Darwin developed his theory of evolution by natural selection on the basis of an understanding of uniform processes in geology, acting over very long periods of time on inheritable variation within populations. One of those processes was competition for resources, as Thomas Malthus had indicated, leading to a struggle to survive and to reproduce. Since some individuals would by chance have traits that allowed them to leave more offspring, those traits would tend to increase in the population. Darwin assembled many lines of evidence to show that variation occurred and that artificial selection by animal and plant breeding had caused change. All of this demanded a reliable mechanism of inheritance.

Pangenesis was Darwin's attempt to provide such a mechanism of inheritance. The idea was that each part of the parent's body emitted tiny particles called gemmules, which migrated through the body to contribute to that parent's gametes, their eggs or sperms. The theory had an intuitive appeal, as characteristics of all parts of the body, such as shape of nose, width of shoulders and length of legs are inherited from both the father and the mother. However, it had some serious weaknesses. Firstly, many characteristics can change during an individual's lifetime, and are affected by the environment: blacksmiths can develop strong arm muscles during their work, so the gemmules from these muscles ought to carry this acquired characteristic. That implies the Lamarckian inheritance of acquired characteristics. Secondly, the fact that the gemmules were supposed to mix together on fertilisation implies blending inheritance, namely that the offspring would all be intermediate between the father and the mother in every characteristic. That directly contradicts the observed facts of inheritance, not least that children are usually either male or female rather than all intersex, and that traits such as flower colour often re-emerge after a generation, even when they seem to disappear when two varieties are crossed. Darwin was aware of both these objections, and accordingly had strong doubts about blending inheritance, as evidenced in his private correspondence. In a letter to T.H. Huxley, dated November 12, 1857, Darwin wrote:

In a letter to Alfred Wallace, dated February 6, 1866, Darwin mentioned conducting hybridization experiments with pea plants, not unlike those done by Gregor Mendel, and like him obtaining segregating (unblended) varieties, effectively disproving his theory of pangenesis with blending:

Blending inheritance was also clearly incompatible with Darwin's theory of evolution by natural selection. The engineer Fleeming Jenkin used this to attack natural selection in his 1867 review of Darwin's On the Origin of Species. Jenkin noted, correctly, that if inheritance were by blending, any beneficial trait that might arise in a lineage would have "blended away" long before natural selection had time to act. The evolutionary biologist Richard Dawkins commented that blending inheritance was observably wrong, as it implied that every generation would be more uniform than the one before, and that Darwin should have said as much to Jenkin. The problem was not with natural selection, but with blending, and in Dawkins's view, Darwin should have settled for saying that the mechanism of inheritance was unknown, but certainly non-blending.

Replacement by Mendelian inheritance

Blending inheritance was dismissed by the eventual widespread acceptance, after his death, of Gregor Mendel's theory of particulate inheritance, which he had presented in Experiments on Plant Hybridization (1865). In 1892, August Weismann set out the idea of a hereditary material, which he called the germ plasm, confined to the gonads and independent of the rest of the body (the soma). In Weismann's view, the germ plasm formed the body, but the body did not influence the germ plasm, except indirectly by natural selection. This contradicted both Darwin's pangenesis and Lamarckian inheritance. Mendel's work was rediscovered in 1900 by the geneticist Hugo de Vries and others, soon confirmed that same year by experiments by William Bateson. Mendelian inheritance with segregating, particulate alleles came to be understood as the explanation for both discrete and continuously varying characteristics.

See also
 Aristotle's biology
 Incomplete dominance

Notes

References

Sources

 
 
 

Classical genetics